A. Manette Ansay (born 1964) is an American author.  She was born in Lapeer, Michigan. When she was five, her family moved to Port Washington, Wisconsin, where she graduated from Port Washington High School in 1982.

Her 1994 novel Vinegar Hill was chosen as an Oprah's Book Club selection in November 1999.  It was adapted as a television film in 2005, starring Mary-Louise Parker and Tom Skerritt.

She attended Cornell University, graduating with an MFA in 1991.

Works

Fiction
Vinegar Hill (1994)
Read This and Tell Me What It Says (1995)
Sister (1996)
River Angel (1998)
Midnight Champagne (1999)
Blue Water (2006)
Good Things I Wish You (2009)

Nonfiction
Limbo (2002)

Recognitions
Vinegar Hill was chosen as an Oprah's Book Club selection November 1999.
Midnight Champagne was a finalist for the National Book Critics Circle Award.
 Former resident of the Ragdale Foundation

References

External links
Official website

20th-century American novelists
21st-century American novelists
American women novelists
1964 births
Living people
Novelists from Michigan
Novelists from Wisconsin
20th-century American women writers
21st-century American women writers
People from Lapeer, Michigan
People from Port Washington, Wisconsin
Cornell University alumni